The January 2008 North American storm complex was a powerful Pacific extratropical cyclone that affected a large portion of North America, primarily stretching from western British Columbia to near the Tijuana, Mexico area, starting on January 3, 2008. The system was responsible for flooding rains across many areas in California along with very strong winds locally exceeding hurricane force strength as well as heavy mountain snows across the Cascade and Sierra Nevada mountain chains as well as those in Idaho, Utah and Colorado. The storms were responsible for the death of at least 12 people across three states, and extensive damage to utility services as well, as damage to some other structures. The storm was also responsible for most of the January 2008 tornado outbreak from January 7–8.

Meteorological synopsis
The strong low-pressure system responsible for much of the extreme weather  traversed much of the Pacific Ocean, before the first storm arrived late on January 3. (This storm was actually a part of a series of three storms.) On December 29, 2007, a powerful extratropical disturbance developed over eastern Siberia, which emerged into the northwest Pacific, and moved to the Aleutian Islands as a well-defined low by January 3. On January 2, another extratropical disturbance developed within a well-defined trough of low pressure, in the northeast Pacific Ocean. On January 3, the 1st storm system approached the northern part of the West Coast, powered by a Pineapple Express atmospheric river, resulting in heavy downpours of rain and strong gusts across much of the Western Seaboard. Late on January 3, the 2nd storm system in the Gulf of Alaska split, with the 3rd, new storm to the south usurping the majority of the moisture of the 2nd system. On January 4, as the 1st storm system weakened, and the southern part of the storm split off into another storm, which began moving eastward across the Southern United States. Later on the same day, as the first storm began moving ashore in British Columbia, the 3rd (and the most powerful) storm brought the largest bands of snow and rain, which impacted the Pacific Coast from British Columbia to northern Mexico, on January 4. Heavy downpours of rain, heavy snow, and fierce winds lashed the West Coast. Meanwhile, the 2nd storm system slowly moved eastward along the southern coast of Alaska, before stalling in the Gulf of Alaska on January 5. By this time, the 3rd storm's explosive intensification had transformed the system into a massive superstorm, becoming the dominant system in the Western US. The highest reported wind gusts were 165 mph (266 km/h) in Tahoe City, California, equivalent to a Category 5 hurricane on the Saffir- Simpson scale. Early on January 5, the superstorm reached a minimum low pressure of  - the pressure equivalent of a Category 3 hurricane, becoming the most powerful storm on record to affect the West Coast, in terms of low pressure. Later on the same day, the 3rd storm began to interact with the 1st storm, which was situated over northwestern Canada, weakening that system. Also, the superstorm slowly began to weaken, and it developed a secondary low to the north of Montana, as the system gradually began to split. Late on January 6, the superstorm's secondary low became the dominant low in the system, as the storm system's circulation began to break down. On January 6, the superstorm's original low pressure center was absorbed into the 2nd storm, located just south of Alaska, while the main bulk of the storm system continued moving eastward, across Western Canada. However, the western chunk of the storm complex's moisture continued to dump rain and snow across the Western US. On the afternoon of January 6, Kirkwood Ski Resort reported  of snow in 48 hours with a storm total of 11 feet.

On January 7, the storm complex weakened further, and the circulation in the western half of the storm completely collapsed, resulting in the storm's moisture spreading out throughout most of the Western United States. Soon afterwards, a few clumps of the mass of moisture organized into separate storm systems, while the dominant low over Canada stalled just southwest of Hudson Bay. As the storm complex moved westward on January 7, the instability in the air triggered a rare January tornado outbreak, spawning 55 tornadoes over the course of 2 days, resulting in the deaths of 4 more people. On January 8, the western fragment of the complex in the US dissipated, while the southern and eastern chunks continued to organize. On the same day, the 2nd storm system in the Gulf of Alaska was absorbed by another more powerful incoming extratropical cyclone, even as the main storm complex continued heading eastward across the United States. Later on January 8, the eastern chunk of the storm complex merged into the southern chunk, while the low near Hudson Bay began to deteriorate. On January 9, the low pressure center over the Great Lakes region became the dominant low of the storm complex. On the same day, the 1st storm over northern Canada was absorbed by a cold front, even as the storm complex continued to organize over the Eastern United States, triggering more tornadoes across the region. By January 9, the storm complex had organized into a  storm to the northeast of the Great Lakes, and it began to strip away moisture from the low near Hudson Bay. The storm complex slowly moved northeastward, and the storm's outer rainband eventually exited the East Coast. On January 10, the low west of Hudson Bay dissipated, while the main storm complex began to exit Atlantic Canada. On January 11, the storm entered Labrador Sea, and stalled for several hours, before continuing to move northeastward. At the same time, the system gradually weakened. On January 12, the system reorganized to the southeast of Greenland, and was assigned the name Ilse by the Free University of Berlin. During the next couple of days, Ilse accelerated northeastward, before turning to the east on January 17. On January 22, Ilse was absorbed by another extratropical cyclone to the south, over the Barents Sea.

Impacts

Bay Area Rapid Transit was also disrupted with significant delays to service and was even interrupted between San Francisco and Daly City briefly due to fallen trees on the network's tracks.

Strong winds knocked power lines down causing power outages for 1.2 million Californians, while several outages were reported in Washington and Oregon. About  of California power lines were damaged by the storm.

The storm closed ski resorts, toppled trees, and created mudslides. Highways from Sacramento to San Francisco were closed by debris. Mandatory evacuations were ordered in Orange County in Southern California. On January 5, a canal levee ruptured near Reno, Nevada and flooded some 800 residences. At least 3000 people were rescued by helicopter from rooftops of flooded homes while cold temperatures hindered rescue efforts.

Nevada Governor Jim Gibbons declared a state of emergency for Lyon County.  The Federal Emergency Management Agency was called in for emergency assistance and distribution of food and water. Bank firm Wells Fargo opened an account to collect donations for the residents of Fernley. Residents began returning home on January 7. California Governor Arnold Schwarzenegger also declared a state of emergency for three counties while Oregon Governor Ted Kulongoski declared a state of emergency for Umatilla County due to wind damage. At least 12 people were killed including two in California, eight in Utah and two in Oregon due to falling branches or trees, traffic accidents, and flooding. Eight of the fatalities were caused by the rollover of a charter bus in southeastern Utah.
7 people in one California home were hospitalized for carbon monoxide poisoning from a lantern. Several other people, including snowmobilers and skiers, were missing in the mountain regions of Colorado. Six snowmobilers were later found alive after calling for emergency services from a train station. A hiker went missing in the San Bernardino Mountains. According to an analysis conducted by meteorologists, a storm of this intensity had not struck California since the 1997–1998 North American winter storm season (as of December 2009).

Tornadoes

January 7 event

January 8 event

See also

 Winter storms of 2007–08
 January 2008 tornado outbreak
 October 2009 North American storm complex
 January 2010 North American winter storms
 October 2010 North American storm complex
 December 2010 North American blizzard
 November 2012 nor'easter
 February 2013 nor'easter
 March 2013 nor'easter
 November 2014 Bering Sea bomb cyclone
 December 2014 North American storm complex

References

External links
 The Hydrometeorological Prediction Center Storm Summary
 Photos of Nevada Levee Break (AccuWeather)
 Satellite Photos of the Storm (CIMSS)
 Storm Summary (NWS Hanford, CA)
 Storm Summary (NWS San Francisco)
 Storm Summary (NWS Pendleton, WA)

North American superstorm, January
Natural disasters in California
Natural disasters in Nevada
Natural disasters in Washington (state)
Natural disasters in Oregon
Natural disasters in Utah
Natural disasters in Idaho
Natural disasters in Colorado
2008 meteorology
2008 in Oregon
Pacific Northwest storms
January 2008 events in North America
2008 in Mexico
History of Tijuana
2008 in British Columbia
21st century in Tijuana